The Gulf of Naples, also called the Bay of Naples, is a roughly 15-kilometer-wide (9.3 mi) gulf located along the south-western coast of Italy (province of Naples, Campania region). It opens to the west into the Mediterranean Sea. It is bordered on the north by the cities of Naples and Pozzuoli, on the east by Mount Vesuvius, and on the south by the Sorrento Peninsula and the main town of the peninsula, Sorrento.  The Peninsula separates the Gulf of Naples from the Gulf of Salerno, which includes the Amalfi Coast.

The islands of Capri, Ischia and Procida are located in the Gulf of Naples. The area is a tourist destination, with the seaside Roman ruins of Pompeii and Herculaneum at the foot of Mount Vesuvius (destroyed in the AD 79 eruption of Vesuvius), along the north coast.

Along with the island of Ischia and gulfs of Pozzuoli and Gaeta, local waters are home to varieties of whales and dolphins including fin and sperm whales.

History 
It is said that the Roman emperor Caligula built a bridge of boats across the bay and rode across it in a chariot while wearing the armor of Alexander the Great.

The Gulf of Naples hosted the sailing events for the 1960 Summer Olympics in Rome.

According to information from Mario Scaramella, twenty nuclear torpedo sea mines were alleged by the International Atomic Energy Agency to have been laid on 10 January 1970 by a Soviet  attack submarine, in the Gulf of Naples at the time of the Cold War to destroy or deny access to the United States Sixth Fleet; the mines are believed to still be on the seabed.

See also 
Killiney Bay in Dublin, Ireland, whose vista is often compared to that of the Bay of Naples

References

External links
1960 Summer Olympics official report. Volume 1. p. 86.
1960 Summer Olympics official report. Volume 2. Part 2. pp. 963–1023.
 

Naples
Naples
Landforms of Campania
Landforms of the Tyrrhenian Sea
Geography of the Metropolitan City of Naples
Mount Vesuvius
Venues of the 1960 Summer Olympics
Olympic sailing venues